MatrixNet is a proprietary machine learning algorithm developed by Yandex and used widely throughout the company products. The algorithm is based on gradient boosting and was introduced since 2009.

Application
CERN is using the algorithm to analyze and search through the colossal data outputs generated by the use of the Large Hadron Collider.

See also
 Yandex Zen

References

Internet search engines
Search engine optimization
Yandex